The 1933–34 season was Union Sportive Musulmane Blidéenne's 1st season in existence. The club played in the Third Division for the 1st season French colonial era, as well as the North African Cup.

Squad

 
 (Captain)

Transfers

Competitions

Overview

League table

Results

Third Division

Matches

Play-off

North African Cup

Squad statistics

Playing statistics

Goalscorers
Includes all competitive matches. The list is sorted alphabetically by surname when total goals are equal.

References

External links
La Presse libre (Alger)
L'Indépendant
Le Tell
L'Echo d'Alger

USM Blida seasons